This is a list of former and current narrow-gauge railways in India. All railways except the heritage ones are closed or under conversion/are converted to the nation-wide standard  gauge, under Project Unigauge.

Assam Bengal Railway (converted to  broad gauge)
 Bareilly–Pilibheet Provincial State Railway (converted to  broad gauge)
 Bengal Nagpur Railway (converted to  broad gauge)
 Bhavnagar State Railway (converted to  broad gauge)
 Bikaner State Railway (converted to  broad gauge)
 Cawnpore–Barabanki Railway (converted to  broad gauge)
 Cochin State Forest Tramway (closed)
 Cooch Behar State Railway (converted to  broad gauge)
 Dhrangadhra Railway (converted to  broad gauge)
 Gaekwar's Baroda State Railway (converted to  broad gauge)
 Gondal State Railway (converted to  broad gauge)
 Jaipur State Railway (converted to  broad gauge)
 Jamnagar & Dwarka Railway (converted to  broad gauge)
 Jetalsar–Rajkot Railway (converted to  broad gauge)
 Jodhpur State Railway (converted to  broad gauge)
 Jodhpur–Bikaner Railway (converted to  broad gauge)
 Junagadh State Railway (converted to  broad gauge)
 Kathiawar State Railway (converted to  broad gauge)
 Lucknow–Sitapur–Seramow Provincial State Railway (converted to  broad gauge)
 Mashrak–Thawe Extension Railway (converted to  broad gauge)
 Morvi Railway (converted to  broad gauge)
 Mysore State Railway (converted to  broad gauge)
 Nagpur Chhattisgarh Railway (converted to  broad gauge)
 Nawabganj Sugar Factory Railway (converted to  broad gauge)
 Nilgiri Mountain Railway (operational)
 Nizam's Guaranteed State Railway (converted to  broad gauge)
 Okhamandal State Railway (converted to  broad gauge)
 Oudh and Rohilkhand Railway (converted to  broad gauge)
 Porbandar State Railway (converted to  broad gauge)
 Rajputana–Malwa Railway (converted to  broad gauge)
 Rohilkund and Kumaon Railway (converted to  broad gauge)
 Southern Mahratta Railway (converted to  broad gauge)
 West of India Portuguese Railway (converted to  broad gauge)

Barsi Light Railway (converted to  broad gauge)
 Bengal Provincial Railway (closed)
 Bhavnagar Tramway (closed)
 Cherra Companyganj State Railways (closed)
 Cooch Behar State Railway (converted to  broad gauge)
 Cutch State Railway (converted to  broad gauge)
 Dehri Rohtas Light Railway (converted to  broad gauge)
 Dholpur–Sarmathura Railway (converted to  broad gauge)
 Gaekwar's Baroda State Railway (converted to  broad gauge)
 Kalka–Shimla Railway (operational)
 Kangra Valley Railway (operational)
 Martin's Light Railways (converted to  broad gauge)
 Mayurbhanj State Railway (converted to  broad gauge)
 McLeod's Light Railways (converted to  broad gauge)
 Morvi Railway (converted to  broad gauge)
 Nasik Tramway (closed)
 Pachora–Jamner railway (converted to  broad gauge)
 Parlakimedi Light Railway (converted to  broad gauge)
 Rajpipla State Railway (converted to  broad gauge)
 Satpura Railway (converted to  broad gauge)
 Shakuntala Railway (converted to  broad gauge)

Darjeeling Himalayan Railway (operational)
 Gwalior Light Railway (converted to  broad gauge)
 Jorehaut Provincial Railway (converted to  broad gauge)
 Kundala Valley Railway (closed)
 Martin's Light Railways (converted to  broad gauge)
 Matheran Hill Railway (operational)
 Ryam Sugar Factory Railway (converted to  broad gauge)

References